Lists of UK top-ten albums is a series of lists showing all the albums that have reached the top 10 (top 5 in 1956, 1957 and until 8 November 1958) on the UK Albums Chart in a particular year. Before 1969, there was no single officially recognised chart, but the Record Mirror (from 22 July 1956), Melody Maker (8 November 1958 to March 1960) and Record Retailer (1960 to 1969) are considered the canonical source for the data.

1950s
1956 
1957 
1958 
1959

1960s
1960 
1961 
1962 
1963 
1964 
1965 
1966 
1967 
1968 
1969

1970s
1970 
1971 
1972 
1973 
1974 
1975 
1976 
1977 
1978 
1979

1980s
1980 
1981 
1982 
1983 
1984 
1985 
1986 
1987 
1988 
1989

1990s
1990 
1991 
1992 
1993 
1994 
1995 
1996 
1997 
1998 
1999

2000s
2000
2001
2002
2003
2004
2005 
2006
2007
2008
2009

2010s
2010
2011
2012
2013
2014
2015
2016
2017
2018
2019

2020s
2020
2021